Priyanka Karki DS Joshi (née Karki) is a Nepalese film actress, model, director and the winner of the Miss Teen Nepal 2005 pageant.

Early Life 
Karki was born in 1987 in Kathmandu, Nepal. Her parents are economist Bhupendra Karki and flight attendant Rakshya Malhotra. She has a younger brother, who resides in the United States. Karki's parents are divorced.

After her 2005 win as Miss Teen Nepal, Karki moved to the United States to continue her education. At the University of North Alabama, she majored in Film and Digital Media Production with a minor in Theatre and graduated Summa Cum Laude.

Career

Acting career 

Karki appeared in Bhulne Po Ho Ki, a small movie project in the USA. She later played a prostitute in Jholay, opposite Dayahang Rai. Jholay grossed over 10 million at the box office. In 2015, she starred along with Sauram Raj Tuladhar and Saugat Malla in the gangster thrilled Sadanga, which was received positively by the audience. Her next big release was Nai Nabannu La 2 opposite Suraj Singh Thakuri, which grossed over four million NPR. She also appeared in several music videos, including 'Guras Fulyo Banai Bhari' a song by Kishor Siwakoti and Asha Bhosle.

Karki's performances in Jholay and Nai Na Bhannu La 2 earned her the Online Filmykhabar Award as Best Actress 2017, NEFTA Award for Best Actor in a supporting role (Female), INFA award for Best Actor in a Supporting Role (Female) and INFA Most Popular Actor (Female).

Her next release Aawaran did not perform as well as previous movies at the box office. Although not a commercial success, it launched Karki as a singer in the Nepalese music industry, and she went on to sing the original soundtrack of Aawaran in collaboration with Yama Buddha.

Karki's Suntali was selected to premiere at the 19th Busan International Film Festival under the category 'A Window on Asian Cinema', on the fifth day of the festival. Suntali was released in February 2015 and although not a success commercially, Karki won Best Actor (Female) at the National Film Critics Award (NFCA) and the NFDC National Film Awards 2017.

In 2015, Karki starred as the title character in the horror/thriller film Mala, a widow, with long black hair and a white sari who is seen throughout the film but speaks only one word. Karki featured on the song "Surke Thaili Khai"; it went on to become the first Nepali song to reach 20 million views on YouTube.

In 2016, Karki appeared as 'Ani' in the fourth installment of the Nai NaBhannu La series. Nai NaBhannu La 4 grossed over 20 million in its first week of release. Soon after, Karki portrayed a female detective opposite Keki Adhikari in the comedy film How Funny.

At the end of the year, Karki was seen as a police inspector in the family drama Shatru Gatey. Her work was highly praised and the movie went on to become one of the most successful movies in Nepali film history celebrating 100 days at the theatre. Karki next appeared in the comedy/social drama Kohalpur Express alongside Keki Adhikari and Reecha Sharma. This female-centric film was highly successful at the box office, though receiving mixed reviews. Karki's releases for 2018 were Katha Kathmandu opposite Ayushman Deshraj Joshi, and Nai Na Bhannu La 5.

Music career 
Karki recorded Bachchu Kailash's classic "Timi le ta Hoina" which is a cover song and released a video for it. Karki also collaborated with YouTube performer Nattu Shah and recorded a cover version of Jason Mraz and Colbie Caillat's 'Lucky'.  Karki's debut single "Swatantra", which is about freedom, liberation, and independence, was released on 1 January 2016. The single had more than 300,000 views during the first two weeks and it hit a million views in the first two months.

Boogie Woogie Nepal 
Karki is one of the judges for the first international dancing reality show Boogie Woogie Nepal alongside choreographer Kabiraj Gahatraj and actor Dilip Rayamajhi.

Personal life 

Priyanka Karki married Rochak Mainali, who lives in Troy, New York, when she was 22, the couple divorced two years later.

After years of speculation, Karki married her long-time boyfriend, fellow Nepalese film actor Ayushman DS Joshi in February 2020. She gave birth to their first child, a girl, in September 2021.

Discography

Filmography

Awards and nominations

References

External links

Priyanka Karki at Instagram

1977 births
Living people
Nepalese beauty pageant winners
Nepalese female models
Nepalese film actresses
Actresses in Nepali cinema
Nepalese television actresses
Actresses in Nepali television
Nepalese Hindus
Actors from Kathmandu
21st-century Nepalese actresses
Nepalese web series actresses
Nepalese child actresses
21st-century Nepalese dancers